George Booth Cary (1811 – March 5, 1850) was a U.S. Representative from Virginia.

Biography
Born at his family estate, Bonny Doon, near Courtland, Virginia, Cary received a liberal education. He engaged in planting.

Cary was elected as a Democrat to the Twenty-seventh Congress (March 4, 1841 – March 3, 1843). He then resumed his agricultural pursuits. He died in Bethlehem, Virginia, March 5, 1850, and was interred in the family cemetery on Bonny Doon.

1841 election

Cary was elected to the U.S. House of Representatives with 56.52% of the vote, defeating an Independent identified only as Collier.

Sources

1811 births
1850 deaths
George B. Cary
Democratic Party members of the United States House of Representatives from Virginia
People from Courtland, Virginia
19th-century American politicians